This is a list of the top 50 singles of 1978 in New Zealand.

Chart
Key
 – Single of New Zealand origin

References

Top 40 singles
1978 record charts
Singles 1978
1970s in New Zealand music